The 2020 ToyotaCare 250 was the 16th stock car race of the 2020 NASCAR Gander RV & Outdoors Truck Series season, the 12th iteration of the event, and the final race of the regular season, therefore making the race the cutoff race to get into the Playoffs. Originally to be held on April 18, 2020, the race was postponed to Thursday, September 10, 2020, due to the COVID-19 pandemic. The race was held in Richmond, Virginia at Richmond Raceway, a  permanent D-shaped oval racetrack. The race took 250 laps to complete. At race's end, Grant Enfinger of ThorSport Racing would pass Matt Crafton with seven to go to win the race, the 5th NASCAR Gander RV & Outdoors Truck Series win of his career and the 3rd of the season. To fill the podium, Matt Crafton and Ben Rhodes, both driving for ThorSport Racing, finished 2nd and 3rd, respectively.

Austin Hill would win the regular season championship, garnering him a bonus 15 playoff points. The 10 drivers making the Playoffs would be Sheldon Creed, Zane Smith, Austin Hill, Grant Enfinger, Brett Moffitt, Ben Rhodes, Matt Crafton, Christian Eckes, Todd Gilliland, and Tyler Ankrum.

Background 

Richmond Raceway is a 3/4-mile (1.2 km), D-shaped, asphalt race track located just outside Richmond, Virginia in Henrico County. It hosts the Monster Energy NASCAR Cup Series and Xfinity Series. Known as "America's premier short track", it formerly hosted a NASCAR Gander Outdoors Truck Series race, an IndyCar Series race, and two USAC sprint car races.

Entry list

Starting lineup 
The starting lineup was based on a metric qualifying system based on the results and fastest lap of the last race, the 2020 South Carolina Education Lottery 200 and owner's points. As a result, Austin Hill of Hattori Racing Enterprises won the pole.

Race results 
Stage 1 Laps: 70

Stage 2 Laps: 70

Stage 3 Laps: 110

References 

2020 NASCAR Gander RV & Outdoors Truck Series
NASCAR races at Richmond Raceway
September 2020 sports events in the United States
2020 in sports in Virginia